This article contains a list of named passenger trains in New Zealand.

New Zealand
Long-distance passenger trains in New Zealand
Named passenger trains